Froelich is an unincorporated community in Clayton County, Iowa, United States.

History
Froelich was once served by its own post office, which is now closed.

Froelich was named for the early landowner of the town site. The agricultural industrialist John Froelich, a son of the town's founder, grew up in Froelich. Froelich's population was 60 in 1902, and 43 in 1925.

References

Unincorporated communities in Clayton County, Iowa
Unincorporated communities in Iowa